What's New About Love? (Portuguese:O Que Há De Novo No Amor?) is a 2011 Portuguese anthology film, consisting of six short-films, directed by Mónica Santana Baptista, Hugo Martins, Tiago Nunes, Hugo Alves, Rui Santos and Patrícia Raposo, produced by Rosa Filmes.

Synopsis 
Six friends meet every evening in a basement to make music. During the daytime, however, there are no rehearsals for what life brings us. Each endeavour leaves its mark...

"João" 
 Written and directed by Tiago Nunes
João lacks the courage to breakup with his girlfriend and takes refuge in the song he is writing for Inês.

"Rita" 
 Written and directed by Mónica Santana Baptista
Rita left Ricardo, Rafael found her, but she still feels lost...

"Eduardo" 
 Written and directed by Hugo Martins
Eduardo thought he no longer liked Maria, but after what he has done he cannot turn the clock back.

"Marco" 
 Written and directed by Hugo Alves
Marco struggles to get another young man’s love, but he is under no illusions.

"Samuel" 
 Written and directed by Rui Santos
Samuel believes in everlasting love but something is wrong because his friends haven’t heard from him for sometime.

"Inês" 
 Written and directed by Patrícia Raposo
Inês, attempting to feel safe, likes to experiment and she's waiting to see how things go with João.

Cast
 Joana Santos as Rita
 Miguel Raposo as Edu
 David Cabecinha as João
 João Cajuda as Marco
 Nuno Casanovas as Samuel
 Inês Vaz as Inês
 Ângelo Rodrigues as Rafael
 Diana Nicolau as Maria
 Sofia Peres as Lígia
 João Pedro Silva as Tiago
 Joana Metrass as Vera
 Raquel André as Sofia
 Sónia Balacó as Bárbara

Soundtrack 
Includes songs by the alternative Portuguese rock bands Os Golpes and Os Velhos, both from the independent record label Amor Fúria, as well as songs by the American band The Walkmen. The original score was composed and performed by the indie Portuguese band Peixe:Avião, besides some songs composed by Hugo Alves, one of the directors. The singer-songwriter Samuel Úria performs in the film, playing two of his songs: Barbarella e Barba Rala and Não Arrastes o Meu Caixão.

Reception 
What's New About Love? was awarded the TAP prize for the best Portuguese feature film at the 2011 edition of the IndieLisboa film festival. The film had its international premiere as part of the official selection of the 19th Raindance Film Festival in London. The film had its South American premiere at the São Paulo International Film Festival, and was also present in other Portuguese-language festivals, like the Santa Maria da Feira Luso-Brazilian Film Festival and the Toronto Portuguese Film Festival.

References

External links 
 Official production company web site with film page
 

Portuguese romantic drama films
2010s Portuguese-language films
2011 films
Anthology films